Ancylomarina psychrotolerans is a Gram-negative, anaerobic, non-spore-forming and non-motile bacterium from the genus of Ancylomarina which has been isolated from sediments from the Fildes Peninsula in the Antarctica.

References

Bacteria described in 2018
Bacteroidia